The 2020 All-Ireland Minor Hurling Championship was the 90th staging of the All-Ireland Minor Hurling Championship since its establishment by the Gaelic Athletic Association in 1928. The championship was due to take place between April and August 2020, however, due to the impact of the COVID-19 pandemic on Gaelic games, new provincial draws and formats were adopted. The championship eventually began on 17 October 2020, however, it was confirmed four days later that the championship was once again being suspended. The championship ended on 10 July 2021.

Galway entered the championship as the defending champions in search of a fourth successive title.

On 10 July 2021, Galway won the championship after a 1-17 to 1-14 defeat of Kilkenny in the All-Ireland final. This was their 14th title overall and a record-breaking fourth title in succession.

Offaly's Lochlainn Quinn was the championship's top scorer with 1-42.

Format changes

On 29 June 2020, the Munster Council announced that they were abandoning the round robin for one year and reverting to a straight knockout format. Kerry joined the championship for the first time since 2014. A day later, the Leinster Council also announced a new format and fixtures. The changes saw the adoption of a straight knockout format, while the championship was also spilt in two with the top 9 teams in the province participating. The four "weakest" teams contested the Leinster Minor B Championship. The All-Ireland quarter-final round robin was also abandoned, with the Leinster champions receiving a bye to the All-Ireland final, while the Munster champions will play Galway in a lone semi-final.

Leinster Minor Hurling Championship

Fixtures/results

Leinster round 1

Leinster quarter-finals

Leinster semi-finals

Leinster final

Munster Minor Hurling Championship

Fixtures/results

Munster quarter-finals

Munster semi-finals

Munster final

All-Ireland Minor Hurling Championship

Fixtures

All-Ireland semi-final

All-Ireland final

Championship statistics

Top scorers

Top scorer overall

In a single game

Miscellaneous
Galway are looking to become the first county at minor level to win four consecutive All Ireland titles.

References

Minor
All-Ireland Minor Hurling Championship
All-Ireland Championship